Georges Pailler (1932 – 6 July 2020), known by the pen name Esparbec, was a French pornographic author.

Biography
Esparbec had written over 100 novels with Media 1000 as his publisher, and 11 pornographic novels published by La Musardine. He used other pseudonyms, such as John Jensen, Victoria Queen, and Georges Péridol. He was considered by Jean-Jacques Pauvert and Georges Wolinski to be the greatest French pornographic writer.

Select bibliography
La Veuve et l'Orphelin (The Widow and the Orphan) (1995)
Monsieur dresse sa bonne (The Gentleman Dresses Up His Maid) (1996)
Le Pornographe et ses modèles (The Pornographer and His Models) (1998)
La Pharmacienne (The Pharmacist Woman) (2003) 
La Foire aux cochons (The Pig Fair) (2003)
Les Mains baladeuses (The Wandering Hands) (2004)
Amour et Popotin (Love and Butts) (2005)
Le Goût du Péché (The Taste of Sin) (2006)
Monsieur est servi (The Gentleman is Served) (2007)
La Jument (The Mare) (2008)
Le Bâton et la Carotte (The Stick and the Carrot) (2009)
Frotti-Frotta (Bump and Grind) (2011)
Les Biscuitières (The Buscuiteers) (2014)
Le Fruit défendu (The Forbidden Fruit) (2015)
La Débauche (The Debauchery) (2017)
L'Esclave de Monsieur Solal (The Slave of Monsieur Solal) (2018)
La Culotte (The Panties) (2019)

References

1940 births
2020 deaths
20th-century French male writers
21st-century French male writers
French male novelists
French erotica writers